Klara Hitler ( Pölzl; 12 August 1860 – 21 December 1907) was the mother of Adolf Hitler, dictator of Nazi Germany.

Family background and marriage
Born in the Austrian village of Spital, Weitra, Waldviertel, Austrian Empire, her father was Johann Baptist Pölzl and her mother was Johanna Hiedler.
Klara came from old peasant stock, was hard-working, energetic, pious, and conscientious. According to the family physician, Dr. Eduard Bloch, she was a very quiet, sweet, and affectionate woman.

In 1876, 16-year-old Klara was hired as a household servant by her relative Alois Hitler, three years after his first marriage to Anna Glasl-Hörer. Although Alois' biological father is unknown, after his mother, Maria Schicklgruber, married Johann Georg Hiedler, Alois was officially designated as Hiedler's son. Klara's mother was Hiedler's niece Johanna Hiedler, who married Johann Baptist Pölzl, making Klara and Alois first cousins once removed.

Following the death of Alois's second wife Franziska Matzelsberger in 1884, Klara and Alois married on 7 January 1885 in a brief ceremony held early in the morning at Hitler's rented rooms on the top floor of the Pommer Inn in Braunau am Inn. Alois then went to work for the day at his job as a customs official.

Their first son, Gustav, was born four months later, on 17 May 1885. Ida followed on 23 September 1886.  Both infants died of diphtheria during the winter of 1887–88. A third child, Otto, was born and died in 1887. A fourth son, Adolf, was born 20 April 1889.

In 1892, Klara Hitler and her family took the train to Passau, where they settled down for the next two years. Edmund was born there on 24 March 1894. Paula followed on 21 January 1896. Edmund died of measles on 28 February 1900, at the age of five.  Of her six children with Alois, only Adolf and Paula survived to adulthood.

Klara Hitler's adult life was spent keeping house and raising children, for whom, according to Smith, Alois had little understanding or interest. She was very devoted to her children and, according to William Patrick Hitler, was a typical stepmother to her stepchildren, Alois, Jr. and Angela.

She was a devout Roman Catholic and attended church regularly with her children.

Later life and death

When Alois died in 1903, he left a government pension. Klara sold the house in Leonding and moved with young Adolf and Paula to an apartment in Linz, where they lived frugally.

In 1906, Klara Hitler discovered a lump in her breast but initially ignored it. After experiencing chest pains that were keeping her awake at night, she finally consulted the family doctor, Eduard Bloch, in January 1907. She had been busy with her household, she said, so had neglected to seek medical aid. Bloch chose not to inform Klara that she had breast cancer and left it to her son Adolf to inform her. Bloch told Adolf that his mother had a small chance of surviving and recommended that she undergo a radical mastectomy. The Hitlers were devastated by the news. According to Bloch, Klara Hitler "accepted the verdict as I was sure she would – with fortitude.  Deeply religious, she assumed that her fate was God's will. It would never occur to her to complain." She underwent the mastectomy at Sisters of St. Mercy in Linz whereupon the surgeon, Karl Urban, discovered that the cancer had already metastasized to the pleural tissue in her chest. Bloch informed Klara's children that her condition was terminal. Adolf, who had been in Vienna ostensibly to study art, moved back home to tend to his mother, as did his siblings. By October, Klara Hitler's condition had rapidly declined and her son Adolf begged Bloch to try a new treatment. For the next 46 days (from November to early December), Bloch performed daily treatments of iodoform, a then experimental form of chemotherapy. Klara Hitler's mastectomy incisions were reopened and massive doses of iodoform-soaked gauze were applied directly to the tissue to "burn" the cancer cells. The treatments were incredibly painful and caused Klara's throat to paralyze, leaving her unable to swallow.

The treatments proved to be futile and Klara Hitler died at home in Linz from the toxic medical side-effects of iodoform on 21 December 1907. Klara was buried in Leonding near Linz.

Adolf Hitler, who had a close relationship with his mother, was devastated by her death and carried the grief for the rest of his life. Bloch later recalled that, "In all my career, I have never seen anyone so prostrate with grief as Adolf Hitler." In his autobiography Mein Kampf, Hitler wrote that he had "honoured my father but loved my mother" and said that his mother's death was a "dreadful blow". Decades later, in 1940, Hitler showed gratitude to Bloch, who was Jewish, for treating his mother, by allowing him to emigrate with his wife from Austria to the United States, a privilege allowed to few other Jews in Austria.

In 1941 and 1943, Bloch was interviewed by the Office of Strategic Services (a predecessor of the Central Intelligence Agency) to gain information about Hitler's childhood. He said that Hitler's most striking feature was his love for his mother:While Hitler was not a mother's boy in the usual sense, I never witnessed a closer attachment. Their love had been mutual. Klara Hitler adored her son. She allowed him his own way whenever possible. For example, she admired his watercolor paintings and drawings and supported his artistic ambitions in opposition to his father at what cost to herself one may guess. Bloch expressly denied the claim that Hitler's love for his mother was pathological.

Bloch remembered Hitler as the "saddest man I had ever seen" when he was informed about his mother's imminent death, while Klara was viewed as a very "pious and kind" woman who "would turn in her grave if she knew what became of him."

In 1934, Hitler honored Klara by naming a street in Passau after her.

Removal of tombstone
On 28 March 2012, the tombstone marking Alois Hitler's grave and that of his wife Klara in Town Cemetery in Leonding was removed, without ceremony, by a descendant, according to Kurt Pittertschatscher, the pastor of the parish. The descendant is said to be an elderly female relative of Alois Hitler's first wife, Anna, who has also given up any rights to the rented burial plot. It is not known what happened to the remains in the grave.

See also
 Hitler family

References
Notes

Bibliography
 Bullock, Alan (1953) Hitler: A Study in Tyranny New York: Harper & Row. 
 Fest, Joachim C. (1973) Hitler. New York: Random House. 
 Kershaw, Ian (1999) Hitler 1889–1936: Hubris. New York: Norton. 

 Langer, Walter C. (1972) The Mind of Adolf Hitler. New York: Basic Books.  ASIN: B000CRPF1K
 Maser, Werner (1973) Hitler: Legend, Myth and Reality. New York: Penguin Books. 
 Rosmus, Anna (2015) Hitlers Nibelungen. Samples Grafenau  
 Smith, Bradley F. (1967, reprint: 1979) Adolf Hitler: His Family, Childhood and Youth, Stanford, California: Hoover Institution Press 
 Vermeeren, Marc {2007) De jeugd van Adolf Hitler 1889–1907 en zijn familie en voorouders. Soesterberg: Uitgeverij Aspekt.

External links
 

1860 births
1907 deaths
19th-century Austrian people
20th-century Austrian people
19th-century Austrian women
20th-century Austrian women
Austrian Roman Catholics
Burials in Austria
Klara
Deaths from cancer in Austria
Deaths from breast cancer
Austrian domestic workers
People from Gmünd District
Adolf Hitler 

he:מוצאו של אדולף היטלר